Graham Tardif (born 1957) is an Australian screen music composer. He is the composer on ten feature films directed and written by Rolf de Heer. Their most acclaimed collaboration, The Tracker (2002), resulted in an APRA-AGSC Screen Music Award for "Far Away Home" as Best Original Song Composed for a Feature Film, Telemovie, TV Series or Mini-Series (shared with de Heer) in 2002. The Tracker also provided wins at Film Critics Circle of Australia Awards (Best Music Score) and IF Awards (Best Music) for the pair.

History 

Graham Tardif was born in 1957. He attended Australian Film, Television and Radio School (AFTRS), Sydney. There he met Dutch-born writer, director and producer Rolf de Heer, for whom he composed screen music on ten feature films. They first worked on de Heer's short film, The Audition (1979), for his AFTRS diploma. Tail of a Tiger (1984) had Tardif composing the score for de Heer's first feature film. Fellow composer and musicologist Cat Hope analysed Tardif and de Heer's works including The Tracker (2002) and Alexandra's Project (2003). She observed, "Tardif's minimal electronic score in Alexandra's Project implies the undercurrent of invisible electro-magnetic signals in an urban landscape, making an ordinary street seem like a harbinger of impending doom." Their "most meaningful collaboration" was on The Tracker where songs were delivered by Indigenous artist Archie Roach, which "not only adds an extra layer of narrative to the film, but also personalises the de Heer/Tardif working relationship and gives it a new voice."

Filmography 

Credited as composer:
 The Sparks Obituary (short, 1978)
 Tasmania’s South West: a Wilderness in Question (documentary, 1979)
 The Audition (short, 1979)
 Tail of a Tiger (1984)
 Thank You Jack (TV film, 1986)
 Incident at Raven's Gate (1988)
 Difficult Pleasure: A Portrait of Brett Whiteley (1989)
 Astonish Me, Graeme Murphy Choreographer (1989)
 Antarctica: Physical Geography (short documentary, 1991)
 Bad Boy Bubby (1993)
 Epsilon  Alien Visitor (1995)
 The Quiet Room (1996)
 Dance Me to My Song (1998)
 Terra Nova (1998)
 The Old Man Who Read Love Stories (2001)
 The Tracker (2002)
 Alexandra's Project (2003)
 Dr. Plonk (2007)
 The King Is Dead! (2012)
 Charlie's Country (2013)
 Still Our Country (2014)

Accolades

|-
! scope="row" | 1988
| Incident at Raven's Gate
|rowspan="3"| Best Original Music Score
|rowspan="3"| AFI Awards
| 
| (shared with Roman Kronen)
| 
|-
! scope="row" | 2003
| Alexandra's Project
| 
|
|
|-
! scope="row" | 2003
| The Old Man Who Read Love Stories
| 
|
|
|-
! scope="row" | 2002
| "Far Away Home"
| Best Original Song Composed for a Feature Film, Telemovie, TV Series or Mini-Series
| APRA-AGSC Screen Music Awards
| 
| (shared with Rolf de Heer)
| 
|-
! scope="row" | 2002
| The Tracker
| Best Original Soundtrack Album
| ARIA Music Awards
| 
| (shared with Rolf de Heer and Archie Roach
| 
|-
! scope="row" | 2002
| The Tracker
|rowspan="2"| Best Music Score
|rowspan="2"| Film Critics Circle of Australia Awards
| 
| (shared with Rolf de Heer)
|
|-
! scope="row" | 2008
|Dr. Plonk
| 
|
|
|-
! scope="row" | 2002
| The Tracker
| Best Music
| IF Awards
| 
| 
|
|-

References

1957 births
Australian film score composers
Male film score composers
Living people